Mallosia imperatrix is a species of beetle in the family Cerambycidae, that can be found in Iran, Lebanon, Syria, and Turkey. The species is yellowish-black coloured.

References

Beetles described in 1885
Saperdini
Insects of Iran
Insects of the Middle East
Insects of Turkey
Taxa named by Elzéar Abeille de Perrin